Kuwait  and Iran have longstanding historical ties spanning hundreds of years, particularly in the pre-oil era. Relations were negatively influenced by the Iranian Revolution in 1979 and the Iran-Iraq War in the 1980s. Relations improved after the Iraqi invasion of Kuwait.

20th century
Historically, Kuwait had close political, economic, and cultural ties to Iran. In 1961, Kuwait became an independent country gaining its sovereignty. In the 1980s, Kuwait sided with Iraq during the Iran-Iraq War. As for the result, Iranian–Kuwaiti relations were damaged and Iran had placed Kuwaiti ships, including tankers, under attack. Kuwait's relations with Iran later improved when Iran denounced Iraq for invading Kuwait in the Gulf War at 1991.

Recent history
Iran's foreign policy shifted with the election of more hardline Ahmadinejad in 2005, negatively influenced its relationship with the international community. Things improved when Hassan Rouhani came to power in 2013. In 2014, Kuwait Foreign Undersecretary Khaled Al-Jarallah said its keen on developing "excellent and historical" relationship with Iran.

Kuwait is concerned about Iranian regional ambitions, finding Iranian influence in Iraq, Syria and Lebanon not welcomed. However, Kuwait continues to maintain friendly relations with Iran. In 2018, after U.S. President Donald Trump announced the United States withdrawal from the Iran nuclear deal Kuwait opted to maintain formal ties with Iran while Saudi Arabia, Bahrain, and the United Arab Emirates voiced strong support for the withdrawal. Previously Kuwait declined to follow Saudi Arabia's lead in severing diplomatic relations following the 2016 attack on the Saudi diplomatic missions in Iran.

In 2018, Kuwait's announced plans for economic development, such as the "Silk City project", includes developing mutually beneficial economic ties with Iran (similar to Iran's current economic ties with Dubai of the United Arab Emirates).

During the outbreak of the COVID-19 pandemic in 2020, Kuwait provided US$10 million in humanitarian aid to Iran.

On March 26, 2022, Iran said that an agreement signed this week by Saudi Arabia and Kuwait to develop the Durra gas field was "illegal" since Tehran has a stake in the field and must be included in any move to operate and develop it.

On April 13, 2022, Saudi Arabia and Kuwait invited Iran to conduct talks on Wednesday to define the eastern border of a combined, energy-rich offshore area, according to the Saudi state news agency SPA.

Historical migrations
'Ajam of Kuwait (Persians of Kuwait) are Kuwaiti citizens of Iranian origin, who migrated to Kuwait over the last couple of hundred years. Historically, Persian ports provided most of Kuwait's economic needs. Marafi Behbahani was one of the first merchants to settle in Kuwait in the 18th century.

Most Shia Kuwaiti citizens are of Iranian ancestry. However, many Kuwaitis of Iranian origin are Sunni  Muslims such as the Al-Kandari and Awadhi families of Larestani ancestry. Some Kuwaitis of Iranian Balochi origin are Sunni Muslim. Balochi families first immigrated to Kuwait in the 19th century.

The Persian sub-dialects of Larestani, Khonji, Bastaki and Gerashi have influenced the vocabulary of Kuwaiti Arabic.

Further reading
 Rerouting the Persian Gulf: The Transnationalization of Iranian Migrant Networks, c.1900–1940
 The Shia Migration from Southwestern Iran to Kuwait: Push-Pull Factors during the Late Nineteenth and Early Twentieth Centuries
 Kuwait and Iran: Mutual Contact in the Pre-oil Era
Between Modern and National Education: The ‘Ajam Schools of Bahrain and Kuwait

See also
 'Ajam of Kuwait
 Ministry of Foreign Affairs (Kuwait)

References

 
Kuwait
Iran